Olivier Doll (born 9 June 1973) is a Belgian retired footballer who played as a defender. He played much of his career at Anderlecht, where he failed to become a regular in the first team therefore trying his luck at Lokeren in the summer of 2004. Since that move, he has played four matches with the Belgium national team (he had already played one match with it in 1997 for the 1998 World Cup qualifying round against Turkey, when he replaced Rudi Smidts after one hour).

Honours 
R.F.C. Seraing
 Belgian Third Division: 1990–91
 Belgian Second Division: 1992–93

Anderlecht Belgian First Division: 1994–95, 1999–2000, 2000–01, 2003–04
 Belgian Cup: runner-up 1996–97
 Belgian Super Cup: 1995, 2000, 2001
 Belgian League Cup: 2000
 Belgian Sports Team of the Year: 2000Individual'''
 Belgian Young Professional Footballer of the Year: 1993–94

References

1973 births
Living people
Belgian footballers
Belgian Pro League players
Association football central defenders
Belgium international footballers
R.F.C. Seraing (1904) players
R.S.C. Anderlecht players
K.S.C. Lokeren Oost-Vlaanderen players
Footballers from Brussels